The subfamily Arctiinae—the tiger moths, ermines, "footmen" and related species—is represented by 32 species in Great Britain:

Tribe Lithosiini

 Thumatha senex, round-winged muslin — south, central & north (localized)
 Setina irrorella, dew moth — south & north-west (Nationally Scarce A)
 Miltochrista miniata, rosy footman — south & central (localized)
 Nudaria mundana, muslin footman — throughout (localized)
 Atolmis rubricollis, red-necked footman — south, west-central & north (localized)
 Cybosia mesomella, four-dotted footman — throughout (localized)
 Pelosia muscerda, dotted footman — east (Red Data Book)
 Pelosia obtusa, small dotted footman — east (Red Data Book)

 Eilema sororcula, orange footman — south (localized)
 Eilema griseola, dingy footman — south & central
 Eilema caniola, hoary footman — south-west (Nationally Scarce B)
 Eilema pygmaeola, pygmy footman (Red Data Book)
 Eilema pygmaeola pygmaeola — east
 Eilema pygmaeola pallifrons — south-east
 Eilema complana, scarce footman — south & central (localized)
 Eilema complana f. sericea, northern footman — west-central (Red Data Book)
 Eilema depressa, buff footman — south & central (localized)
 Eilema lurideola, common footman — south, central & north
 Lithosia quadra, four-spotted footman — immigrant to south-west (Nationally Scarce A)

Tribe Arctiini

 [Spiris striata, feathered footman — uncertain status]
 Coscinia cribraria, speckled footman ‡
 Coscinia cribraria bivittata — south (Red Data Species)
 Coscinia cribraria arenaria — immigrant
 Utetheisa pulchella, crimson speckled — immigrant
 Utetheisa bella, beautiful utetheisa — probable rare immigrant (though possibly an import)
 Parasemia plantaginis, wood tiger
 Parasemia plantaginis plantaginis — throughout
 Parasemia plantaginis insularum — Shetland, Orkney & northern Scotland
 Arctia caja, garden tiger — throughout ‡*
 Arctia villica britannica, cream-spot tiger — south (localized)
 Hyphoraia testudinaria, Patton's tiger — vagrant: 2 records, Sussex & Devon
 Diacrisia sannio, clouded buff — throughout (localized)
 Spilosoma lubricipeda, white ermine — throughout ‡*
 Spilosoma luteum, buff ermine — south, central & north ‡*
 Spilosoma urticae, water ermine — south-east (Nationally Scarce B)
 Diaphora mendica, muslin moth — south, central & north 
 Phragmatobia fuliginosa, ruby tiger
 Phragmatobia fuliginosa borealis — north
 Phragmatobia fuliginosa fuliginosa — south & central
 [Pyrrharctia isabella, isabelline tiger — accidental introduction]
 [Halysidota moeschleri — possible rare transatlantic immigrant or import]
 Euplagia quadripunctaria, Jersey tiger — south-west
 Callimorpha dominula, scarlet tiger — south-west (localized)
 Tyria jacobaeae, cinnabar — south, central & north ‡*
 [Hypercompe scribonia, great leopard — probable import]

Species listed in the 2007 UK Biodiversity Action Plan (BAP) are indicated by a double-dagger symbol (‡)—species so listed for research purposes only are also indicated with an asterisk (‡*).

See also
List of moths of Great Britain (overview)
Family lists: Hepialidae, Cossidae, Zygaenidae, Limacodidae, Sesiidae, Lasiocampidae, Saturniidae, Endromidae, Drepanidae, Thyatiridae, Geometridae, Sphingidae, Notodontidae, Thaumetopoeidae, Lymantriidae, Arctiidae, Ctenuchidae, Nolidae, Noctuidae and Micromoths

References

 Waring, Paul, Martin Townsend and Richard Lewington (2003) Field Guide to the Moths of Great Britain and Ireland. British Wildlife Publishing, Hook, UK. .

External links
 UK Moths

Moths of Great Britain (Arctiidae)
Great Britain (A)
Moths
Britain